Fernando Ledesma Bartret (born 30 December 1939) is a Spanish politician and served as the minister of justice from 1982 to 1986.

Career
He graduated in law from the University of Salamanca and was appointed prosecutor and judge of Administrative Litigation in opposition. He served in the Territorial Courts of Palma de Mallorca, Valladolid, Madrid and the Spanish National Court. By choice of the Congress of Deputies he was appointed member of the General Council of the Judiciary.

Ledesma served as a member of the Council of Judiciary until 1982. He was appointed justice minister on 28 December following the 1982 general elections won by the PSOE. He replaced Pío Cabanillas Gallas in the post. Ledesma was in office until 12 July 1986 when Enrique Múgica Herzog was appointed as justice minister.

Ledesma is a member of the State Council.

References

1939 births
Living people
Justice ministers of Spain
University of Salamanca alumni
People from Toledo, Spain
Members of the General Council of the Judiciary